James Caldwell (July 4, 1763 – 1836) was the first Speaker of the Missouri House of Representatives.

Caldwell was born in Virginia.  During the American Revolutionary War he served under Archibald Woods and Thomas Wright.  In moved Lincoln County, Kentucky where he served under William Whitley in the American Indian Wars.

In 1786 he married Meeke Perrin in Lincoln County.  He served in the Kentucky General Assembly from Harrison County, Kentucky from 1800 to 1807.

In 1810 he moved to Libertyville, Missouri (five miles southeast of Farmington, Missouri in Saint Francois County, Missouri—although it was part of Sainte Genevieve County, Missouri at the time).

In 1822 he was elected to the Missouri State Senate but lost re-election in 1824 to his son-in-law James Kerr

References

1763 births
1840 deaths
People from Virginia
People from Lincoln County, Kentucky
People from St. Francois County, Missouri
Members of the Missouri Territorial Legislature
Missouri state senators
Speakers of the Missouri House of Representatives
Members of the Kentucky General Assembly